LGP may refer to:

Bicol International Airport IATA code
Linear genetic programming, type of genetic programming algorithm
Linux Game Publishing, an English game developing company
Last Glacial Period, the most recent period of Earth glaciation
Lekker Gewerkt Pik, a saying from the Dutch town of Leiden, meaning you did a good thing while working hard
Leandro González Pírez, an Argentine professional footballer
Light guide plate, a type of Diffuser_(optics) used in Liquid-crystal_displays